The Federation of Master Builders (FMB) is a UK trade association established in 1941 to protect the interests of small and medium-sized building firms.

The group is independent and non-profit. It works to lobby for members' interests at both national and local levels. As of 2016, the FMB is the largest construction trade association in the UK, representing over 8,000 construction SMEs.

The FMB aims to provide knowledge, professional advice and support for its members. It works in partnership with other industry companies to provide technical advice and promote high standards. The FMB also offers advice to consumers and enables all of its members to offer warranties on their work through its insurance arm, FMB Insurance.

See also
 National Federation of Builders
 Civil Engineering Contractors Association
 Scottish Building Federation

References

External links 
 

Construction trade groups based in the United Kingdom
Housing in the United Kingdom
Organisations based in the London Borough of Camden
Organizations established in 1941
1941 establishments in the United Kingdom